The anime television series Honey and Clover is based on the manga of the same name by Chika Umino. The series depicts the lives and relationships of five students at a Tokyo art college, four of whom live in the same apartment building. The television series was produced by J.C.Staff and consists of 36 episodes broadcast in two seasons on Fuji TV in the Noitamina programming block. The first season was directed by Ken'ichi Kasai, and consisted of 24 episodes that aired from April 14, 2005 to September 29, 2005 plus two OVA episodes released on volumes 5 and 7 of the DVDs. The second season was directed by Tatsuyuki Nagai, and consisted of 12 episodes that aired between June 29, 2006 to September 14, 2006.

Both seasons were rebroadcast in Japan by the anime CS television network Animax, which also later broadcast the series across its respective networks in Hong Kong, Taiwan, South Korea, and other regions. The series was first broadcast in English on Amimax's Southeast Asia network starting August 1, 2006.

Most episodes titles are a quote or paraphrase from the episode's dialogue. The preview teaser before the episode often adds a second "title". In the following list, the title listed on the official website is listed first, followed by the title given in the teaser, if available.

Episode list

Honey and Clover (2005)

Honey and Clover II (2006)

See also
 List of Honey and Clover characters

References

External links
 Official J.C.Staff website 
 Official Hachikuro.net website 
 Honey and Clover Songs and Lyrics

Honey and Clover